Me Emoldurei de Presente Pra Te Ter is the first EP and release of Brazilian band Banda Uó, released on July 1, 2011. For the production, Rodrigo Gorky and Pedro D'Eyrot (Bonde do Rolê) were called.

Track listing

References 

2011 EPs